Ponts Mill is a hamlet in Cornwall, England, UK. It is a mile north of St Blazey. Ponts Mill was once a port on the Par River, and as late as 1720, 80 ton seagoing vessels could reach the port.

References

Hamlets in Cornwall